This is a list of the Permanent Representatives of Ukraine to the United Nations. Permanent Representative is the head of the permanent mission of Ukraine to the United Nations.

History 
On 26 June 1945, the Charter of the United Nations was signed and came into force on 24 October 1945. Ukraine was among the first countries that signed the United Nations Charter, becoming a founding member of the United Nations among 51 countries.

Dmitry Manuilsky, head of the Ukrainian delegation at the United Nations Conference on International Organization, held in April–June 1945 in San Francisco, was elected Chairman of the First Committee, which elaborated the Preamble and Chapter 1 (Purposes and Principles) of the United Nations Charter. Until 1958 the permanent mission of Ukraine was led by the Minister of Foreign Affairs rather than the permanent representative.

Since Ukraine's independence in August 1991, membership in the United Nations is a priority of Ukraine's foreign policy.

Permanent Mission Composition
The permanent mission of Ukraine consists of permanent representative, three counsellors (one of which is a permanent representative deputy) and a military adviser. The permanent mission also includes about 10 various secretaries and attaches.

List

See also
Foreign relations of Ukraine
Vasyl Tarasenko - representative of the Ukrainian SSR in the United Nations Economic and Social Council, the United Nations Security Council (1948-1949).

References

External links 
 Ministry of Foreign Affairs of Ukraine
 Permanent Mission of Ukraine to the United Nations
 Ukraine And The United Nations
 Ukraine's U.N. Mission celebrates 40th anniversary

Ukraine